OISD is an acronym that may refer to:

Independent School Districts in Texas - O
Oil Industry Safety Directorate